is a city located at the confluence of the Honami and Onga rivers in central Fukuoka Prefecture, Japan. The city was founded on January 20, 1932.

History
Iizuka was an important post-station on the Nagasaki Kaidō during the Edo Era. As Japan industrialised, Iizuka became the center of the most productive coal fields in Japan located throughout the surrounding Chikuho district. After the end of Second World War there was a large influx of people into the city as it was one of the few areas that offered a large number of jobs in the coal mines and related fields. Since the coal mines closed, Iizuka City has suffered from a consistently declining population base. However, its proximity to both Fukuoka City and Kitakyushu City cushioned the effect of the coal industry shutdown and kept the local economy from going into freefall. Now Iizuka has a strong light industrial base and is a center for education and a rapidly expanding IT economy.

Geography and demographics
On March 26, 2006, Iizuka absorbed the towns of Chikuho, Honami, Kaita and Shōnai (all from Kaho District) to create the new and expanded city of Iizuka. As of August 31, 2016, the city has an estimated population of 130,015 and a population density of 607.35 persons per km². The total area is 214.07 km².

Climate
Iizuka has a humid subtropical climate (Köppen climate classification Cfa) with hot summers and cool winters. Precipitation is significant throughout the year, but is much higher in summer than in winter.

People
 Former prime minister Tarō Asō was born in Iizuka and retains a large house in the city.
 Japanese filmmaker Hiroshi Teshigahara chose Iizuka as the setting for his film Pitfall which takes place in the coal mines. The film was a collaboration with the author of Pitfall, Kōbō Abe. Teshigahara stated in an interview that Iizuka closely resembled the landscape depicted in the novel.
 Kenji Suetsugu, the professional English-Japanese translator, was born and grew up in Namazuta, Iizuka. Mr. Suetsugu has been contributing to the globalization of Japanese businesses, enterprises and municipalities, working as a highly experienced translator for these organizations. Mr. Suetsugu translated much tourism information designed for non-Japanese visitors in Japan. Such information includes Iizuka Guide Maps and brochures for non-Japanese people who live, stay and/or visit Iizuka, Kyoto and other parts of Japan.

Primary and secondary schools

The city formerly had a North Korean school, Chikuho Korean Elementary School (筑豊朝鮮初級学校).

See also
Coto Coto Train, a touristic service
Iizuka Station
Kyushu Institute of Technology

References

External links

 Iizuka City official website 
 Kyushu Institute of Technology Iizuka campus 

 
Cities in Fukuoka Prefecture